Asta Olivia Nordenhof (born 1988) is a Danish poet and novelist. She studied at the Danish Academy of Creative Writing, where she now teaches. 

Nordenhof published her debut novel Et ansigt til Emily (A Face for Emily) in 2011, a patchwork- novel about the love between two women which won the Munch-Christensen’s Debutant Prize.

In 2013, she published her critically acclaimed poetry collection Det nemme og det ensomme (The Easiness and the Loneliness) which won Montanas Literary Award that same year. Det nemme og det ensomme has been translated to Norwegian, Swedish (published by Modernista) and English (published by Open Letter Books).

In 2020, she published her novel Penge på lommen (Money to Burn), the first part in septology entitled Scandinavian Star. The series takes its name from the MS Scandinavian Star, a passenger ferry  that was set on fire on April 6, 1990, killing 159 people.

Since publication, Penge på lommen has been sold to 8 territories and has won several awards, most notably the P.O. Enquist Prize in 2020 and the EU Prize for Literature. In 2021, Penge på lommen was nominated for the Nordic Council Literature Prize 2021.

Bibliography

Novels 

 Et ansigt til Emily (2011, "A Face for Emily, Basilisk")
 Scandinavian Star del 1. — Penge på lommen (2020, "Money to Burn")

Poetry 
 Det nemme og det ensomme (2013, "The Easiness and the Loneliness")

References

Danish writers
1988 births
Living people